Culture of Fear is the sixth studio album by American electronic music duo Thievery Corporation, released on June 28, 2011 by ESL Music.

Track listing
 "Web of Deception" - 4:33
 "Culture of Fear" (featuring Mr. Lif) – 3:12
 "Take My Soul" (featuring Lou Lou) – 3:51
 "Light Flares" – 3:01
 "Stargazer" (featuring Sleepy Wonder) – 3:45
 "Where It All Starts" (featuring Lou Lou) – 3:21
 "Tower Seven" – 7:48
 "Is It Over?" (featuring Shana Halligan) – 3:22
 "False Flag Dub" (featuring Ras Puma) – 3:05
 "Safar (The Journey)" (featuring Lou Lou) – 1:43
 "Fragments" – 4:11
 "Overstand" (featuring Ras Puma) – 3:40
 "Free" (featuring Kota) – 4:03

Personnel

Vocals
Tamara Wellons (1)
Mr. Lif (2)
Lou Lou Ghelichkhani (3, 6, 10)
Sleepy Wonder (5)
Shana Halligan (8)
Chris "Ras Puma" Smith (9, 12)
Sylvia Bernice Eberhardt (13)

Instrumentation
Bass: Ashish Vyas (1, 3, 5, 7, 9)
Guitar: Robbie Myers (1, 2, 3), Federico Aubele (6), Jeff "Jahlex" Alexander (13)
Keys: Will Rast (1, 2, 3), Darrell Burke (5, 12)
Percussion: Jeff Franca (1, 2, 3, 5, 10, 11, 12, 13)
Drums: Jeff Franca (2, 12, 13), Andrew Black (2)
Horns: Dave Finnell (2, 7, 12), Frank Mitchell Jr. (2, 7, 12)
Organ: Will Rast (12)
Melodica: Jeff Franca (10, 13)
All other instruments by Eric Hilton and Rob Garza.

Charts

Weekly charts

Year-end charts

References

Thievery Corporation albums
2011 albums
Reggae fusion albums